Karthikesu Nadarasa Kanagaratnam (commonly known as Vinthan Kanagaratnam) is a Sri Lankan Tamil politician and provincial councillor.

Kanagaratnam is treasurer of the Tamil Eelam Liberation Organization. He contested the 2009 local government election as one of the Tamil National Alliance's candidates and was elected to the Jaffna Municipal Council. He contested the 2013 provincial council election as one of the TNA's candidates in Jaffna District and was elected to the Northern Provincial Council. After the election he was appointed to assist the Minister of Fisheries, Transport, Trade and Rural Development on trade and commerce. He took his oath as provincial councillor in front of Chief Minister C. V. Vigneswaran at Veerasingam Hall on 11 October 2013.

References

Jaffna municipal councillors
Living people
Members of the Northern Provincial Council
People from Jaffna
Sri Lankan Tamil politicians
Tamil Eelam Liberation Organization politicians
Tamil National Alliance politicians
Year of birth missing (living people)